Real Sport Clube is a Portuguese football club situated in Queluz that competes in the Liga 3. They were founded in 1951.

Current squad

Honours
Campeonato de Portugal: 1
2016–17

References

External links
 
 Squad at Zerozero

Football clubs in Portugal
Association football clubs established in 1951
1951 establishments in Portugal
Liga Portugal 2 clubs